Vice-Admiral Samuel Reeve (c. 1733 – 5 May 1803) was an officer of the British Royal Navy who saw service in the American Revolutionary War and the French Revolutionary Wars.

in 1779 he was captain of HMS Surprize, seizing American privateers Monmouth, Wild Cat and Jason off the coast of Newfoundland. On 20 January 1780 Surprize captured French privateer Duguay Trouin, and in January 1781 captured Les Sept Freres.

The Raid on Genoa was a success, and six days later Reeve discovered and captured the abandoned French ship Impérieuse at La Spezia.

Reeve was promoted to vice-admiral in 1799, and  retired to his home near Ipswich. On 5 May 1803 Reeve was riding in a chaise near his home when the horse bolted. Reeve was flung from the chaise and was killed immediately, suffering a broken neck.

Notes

1730s births
1803 deaths
Royal Navy admirals
Royal Navy personnel of the French Revolutionary Wars
Road incident deaths in England